Lata Palace is a palace in the village of Lata, Gulripshi municipality, Autonomous Republic of Abkhazia, Georgia.

History 
The palace was built in the middle ages. The construction was built with the stone and brick blocks. The entrance doors are located in the eastern and northern walls. The palace consists of seven sections that are connected to each other with the doors. All sections have large windows. The seventh section is currently most well preserved. It is built with stone blocks and has a stone roofing too. Apparently, this section was a water reservoir. The palace had a stone floor, which is currently more or less preserved. The roofing is already crumbled. The walls are 6 meters high and 1 meter thick.

References 

Palaces in Georgia (country)